Calema are a music duo from São Tomé and Príncipe with origins in Portugal formed by the two brothers António Mendes Ferreira (born 5 April 1992) and Fradique Mendes Ferreira (born 19 March 1987). The name of the duo refers to the special undulation on the African coast.

Early life

They started singing together at a very young age as they took music as a hobby. In 2008 they came to Portugal to pursue their professional degrees on the music industry. Fradique pursued a degree in Multimedia in Évora and António, a degree in Video Production in Lisbon. In 2011 they went to France with their family and kept on doing music, as they created their cover channel on YouTube.

Career
Three years after they were in France, Anselmo Ralph noticed them and made them enter the Portuguese music scene. Later on, they produced the album "A Nossa Vez" or simply "A.N.V" which included the song A Nossa Vez. The song ended the year of 2017 as the most viewed music video on YouTube sung in the Portuguese language.

In February 2019 they were announced as the composers and interpreters of the song "A Dois", which participated on the Festival da Canção 2019.

In 2021, Calema was featured in a song by Moroccan superstar Saad Lamjarred in "Enty Hayati" (in Arabic إنتي حياتي meaning You are my life). The song is trilingual in Arabic, Portuguese and English with an accompanying music video.

Discography

Studio albums

Live albums

Singles
2019: "A Dois"
2020: "Vai"
2022: "Te Amo"

Featured in
2021: "Enty Hayati" (Saad Lamjarred featuring Calema)

References

External links 

 

Portuguese electronic music groups
Musical duos
São Tomé and Príncipe musicians